Strukovo is a rural locality (a village) in Kolokshanskoye Rural Settlement, Sobinsky District, Vladimir Oblast, Russia. The population was 12 as of 2010.

Geography 
Strukovo is located 29 km northeast of Sobinka (the district's administrative centre) by road. Roganovo is the nearest rural locality.

References 

Rural localities in Sobinsky District